Adelaida District AVA is an American Viticultural Area located on the north west portion of the Paso Robles AVA in San Luis Obispo County, California. It was established by the Alcohol and Tobacco Tax and Trade Bureau in 2014. Wineries located within the Adelaida District are: The Farm Winery, Peachy Canyon Winery, Le Cuvier, Alta Colina, Carmody McKnight Estate Wines, Wild Coyote, Villicana, McPrice Myers, Jacob Toft, Chronic Cellars, Vines on the Marycrest, Lone Madrone, Adelaida Cellars, DAOU, Calcareous, Law Estate, Nadeau, Minassian Young, Michael Gill, Villa Creek, Brecon, HammerSky, Oso Libre, Poallilo, Thacher Winery, Whalebone Vineyard, Tablas Creek Vineyard, Halter Ranch, Rangeland, Justin, Kukkula, Dubost, and Starr Ranch.

History
In the early 1920s Ignacy Jan Paderewski, a noted pianist, composer and prime minister of Poland, planted Petite Sirah and Zinfandel on his Rancho San Ignacio vineyard in the Adelaida area. In 1964, Dr. Stanley Hoffman purchased a 1,200-acre ranch in the Adelaida District and, with the assistance of influential winemaker André Tchelistcheff, planted vineyards creating the Hoffman Mountain Ranch Winery, the first modern commercial winery in Paso Robles, California.

Geography and climate
The Adelaida District AVA covers 53,342 acres with 883 planted in vineyards. It lies in the Santa Lucia Range with high mountain slopes grading to foothills;  in elevation.

Viticulture
The district's calcareous soils consist of shallow, bedrock residual soils and patchy colluvial hillside soils from middle member of Monterey Formation and older rock.

Grape varieties and wine
The most widely planted varieties in the Adelaida District AVA are Mourvèdre, Zinfandel, Cabernet Sauvignon, Syrah, Grenache and Merlot.

References

American Viticultural Areas
American Viticultural Areas of California
Wine regions
San Luis Obispo County, California
Wineries in California
Paso Robles, California
2014 establishments in California